Teresa Arkel (1861 or 1862 – July 1929), born Therese Blumenfeld, was a Ukrainian-born, Austrian-trained opera singer, based in Milan.

Early life 
Therese Blumenfeld was born in Lemberg, now Lviv, Ukraine, the daughter of Emanuel Blumenfeld. Her family was Jewish; her father was a prominent lawyer and community leader. She trained as a singer in Vienna with Luise Dustmann. Her nephew was radiologist .

Career 
Arkel, a dramatic soprano know for her impressive range and technique, made her operatic debut in 1884, in Les Huguenots. In 1885 she was on the opera stage in Warsaw, appearing in Aida, Il trovatore, and L'Africaine. She sang throughout Europe, from Bilbao and Paris to Prague and Budapest. In 1890 she was the first to perform the lead role in Emilio Serrano's Doña Juana la Loca, in Madrid. She also sang in Buenos Aires, in 1894, in Otello and Lohengrin. In 1898, she was the first to perform the lead role in Zygmunt Noskowski's Livia Quintilla, in her hometown.

After her stage career, she taught voice in Milan. and made several early recordings between 1903 and 1905. Her students included Phyllis Wolfe, Tina Desana, Nina Gale, Inez Wilson, Nina Morgana, and Rosa Ponselle.

Personal life 
Therese Blumenfeld married Sigmund Arkel. They had two children. Arkel died in Milan in 1929, in her late sixties. Her voice was included on The Record of Singing, a compilation of early recordings published in 1977.

References

External links 
 A 1905 recording of Teresa Arkel singing ("Porgi amor" in English from The Marriage of Figaro, Library of Congress, National Jukebox
 A 1905 recording of Teresa Arkel singing, at Internet Archive

1860s births
1929 deaths
Year of birth uncertain
Ukrainian operatic sopranos
Musicians from Lviv
Voice teachers
Jewish Ukrainian musicians
20th-century Ukrainian Jews
Ukrainian emigrants to Italy
20th-century Ukrainian women opera singers